Jerry Adler is a former Senior Editor for Newsweek and Yahoo! News. He writes for Smithsonian and Scientific American magazines, International Business Times, The New Yorker, New York, Wired, Scientific American, Smithsonian, The Daily Beast, Esquire, and is the author of High Rise, about the building of a skyscraper, and co-author of The Price of Terror, about the struggle of families of Pan Am 103 victims to get justice after the Lockerbie bombing. In 2009 he originated Newsverse at Newsweek.com, a weekly satirical poem. He appeared on MSNBC's "Rachel Maddow Show" to recite one of his poems in 2010.

His articles were twice finalists for National Magazine Awards and won a Sydney Hillman award.

Education
He received his B.A. in American history from Yale University in 1970.

Books
 The Price of Terror, Allan Gerson, Jerry Adler, Publisher: Harper (2001), 
 High Rise: How 1,000 Men and Women Worked Around the Clock for Five Years and Lost $200 Million Building a Skyscraper, Jerry Adler,  Harpercollins (1994),

References

American male journalists
Yale College alumni
Living people
Year of birth missing (living people)